Sepia is a mid-sized, upscale restaurant run by owner Emmanuel Nony and Executive Chef Andrew Zimmerman located in the West Loop neighborhood of Chicago, Illinois (United States). Chef Zimmerman's menu is classified as New American cuisine, and focuses on local, seasonal products. Built in Chicago's Warehouse District, Sepia was originally a print shop from the 1890s. The renovation for the restaurant, designed by Gary Lee, included putting in a custom-tile, Art Nouveau floor and hand-crafted millwork in order to enhance the historical qualities of the building. Sepia also uses vintage stemware for their tables matching the vintage interior decor of the restaurant.

Description
Sepia seats around 95 guests and is located in the West Loop neighborhood of Chicago, Illinois. Its product-driven menu created by Executive Chef Andrew Zimmerman focuses on local, seasonal ingredients which provide the foundation for his New American cuisine. Chef Zimmerman's Michelin-starred menu showcases ingredients that are locally sourced and primarily organic and/or sustainable. Zimmerman's pastas, chutneys and jams are all homemade; he supports local artisan farmers and encourages craftsmanship and the revival of traditional practices.

Sepia has received positive reviews from both local and national critics. It has received three star to three-and-a-half star ratings from the Chicago Tribune, Chicago Sun-Times, and Chicago. The restaurant was awarded a one star in Chicago's inaugural Michelin Guide in 2011 and has since then retained its one star rating. In addition, Chef Andrew Zimmerman competed in the Food Network’s Iron Chef America and defeated his opponent, Iron Chef Marc Forgione.

Owner
Built into a historical 1890s print shop, Sepia was established in 2007 as restaurateur Emmanuel Nony's first independent venture. Working together with Executive Chef Andrew Zimmerman, Nony and Sepia have received critical acclaim, including a Michelin star since the guide’s first Chicago edition in 2011, as well as James Beard Foundation nominations in 2012 and 2013 for “Best Chef: Great Lakes” and “Outstanding Wine Program,” and the title of “Restaurant of the Year” at the 2012 Jean Banchet Awards.

Nony's career reached another milestone in 2012 when he opened Private Dining by Sepia, a separate venue located next to the restaurant.

Executive chef
Restaurateur Emmanuel Nony and Zimmerman met in 2008 and after a year, Nony offered him the position of executive chef at his newest restaurant, Sepia. Since taking the lead in the kitchen at Chicago's Sepia in 2009, Executive Chef Andrew Zimmerman has helped elevate Sepia to become a nationally recognized restaurant.

Awards
Michelin travel guide, One star rating from 2011 through 2022 
Rising Star Chef Award by StarChefs.com, 2011
Jean Banchet Awards nomination for “Chef of the Year,” 2011 & 2012 and winner of “Restaurant of the Year” 2013
Jean Banchet Award for "Celebrity Pastry Chef of the Year," in 2010
James Beard Foundation Award finalist for "Best Chef: Great Lakes," 2012 & 2013
James Beard Foundation Award semi-finalist for "Outstanding Wine Program" 2012 & 2013
James Beard Foundation Award for "Best Restaurant Graphics" in 2008
Crain's Chicago Business “Best of Business Dining” 2012
Three-star reviews from Chicago Tribune,  and Chicago Sun-Times and 3.5 stars in Chicago magazine
Humanitarian of the Year Award/Plate magazine, 2012
Events
Charleston Wine + Food Festival, 2013
Cochon Heritage Fire in Napa, 2011 & 2012
Food & Wine’s Entertaining Showcase, 2011 & 2012
James Beard Dinner, 2010
Television 
Competed in Iron Chef America, defeating Chef Marc Forgione, 2012
Appeared on The Today Show cooking segment, 2012

Culinary diplomacy
In addition to his culinary industry recognition, Zimmerman has also been honored by the United States government. He was invited by the State Department Chief of Protocol Capricia Penavic Marshall to join the newly formed American Chef Corps and serve the country in a diplomatic capacity. Zimmerman joins the ranks of other nationally renowned chefs to showcase American cuisine to other nations, enhance formal diplomacy, and cultivate cultural understanding.

Menu
Sepia offers lunch and dinner with entrée's ranging between $28–$36. Their seasonal menus are based on traditional fare using contemporary techniques. The menu favors local artisan growers using sustainable practices. The same care is taken with their wine and cocktail list as they do with their dining menus, sourcing artisanal winemakers and creating housemade cocktails.

Sepia's beverage program features a selection of wines from around the world. More than 20 wines by-the-glass and 400 bottles are available, including unique varietals from Slovenia, Hungary, Croatia and Greece, as well as more familiar wine destinations. The cocktail menu is created by Head Bartender and notable mixologist, Griffin Elliott, and changes seasonally.

See also
 List of New American restaurants

References

External links

Restaurants in Chicago
Michelin Guide starred restaurants in Illinois
New American restaurants in the United States